The Kurenkahn (German plural) is a traditional wooden type of flat bottom boat that was used in Vistula lagoon and Curonian Lagoon, East Prussia. The name comes from the German name of the Curonian people (Kuren). Kurenkahns were 11–12 m long, with two main sails: the large and the small. Kurenkahns were used to catch fish by dragging a large net (Kurrennetz) in pairs. After the expulsion of Germans from East Prussia, Kurenkahns were used for some time for fishing, but were later abandoned.
In 2001 a replica of a Kurenkahn was rebuilt in part of former Memel territory now in Lithuania.

External links

Eine Fahrt mit dem Kurenkahn

Bibliography
 Werner Jaeger, nd: Die Fischerkähne auf dem kurischen Haff 
 Hans Woede, 1966: Die Wimpel der Kurenkähne. Geschichte – Bedeutung – Brauchtum. Würzburg
 Martin Kakies, 2002: Die Kurische Nehrung in 144 Bildern. Rautenberg 

Indigenous boats
Sailboat types
East Prussia